The Roches is the 1979 eponymous debut trio album by The Roches, produced by Robert Fripp, who also plays guitar and Fripperies (a variation of his Frippertronics). Also playing on the album are Tony Levin and Jimmy Maelen.

Background
Paul Simon had been so impressed by Maggie and Terre Roche that he invited them to sing harmony on the song "Was a Sunny Day" on his album There Goes Rhymin' Simon. He helped them get a publishing deal and a record contract, and even produced one song on the duo’s 1975 album Seductive Reasoning. The label advised the sisters to "wear hipper clothes." Terre Roche later said:
We were humiliated... We wanted to get out of the whole situation. We had a friend in Hammond, Louisiana, who was running a kung fu school. We gave up our apartment and told the record company, ‘We’re not going to promote the record anymore; we’re going away for a while.’ This was two weeks after the record came out. Maggie wrote the "Hammond Song" about the whole experience.

Reception

The album was well received. John Rockwell in The New York Times wrote that the album was "... the best pop record of 1979 thus far. In fact, it's so superior that it will be remarkable if another disk comes along to supplant it as best album of the year." Rockwell subsequently picked it as the best album of that year, stating that it was "... also the scariest record, because the Roches probe emotions and even fears that most pop — most art, even — does not approach." Jay Cocks in Time magazine wrote that the Roches music "is startling, lacerating and amusing". The Village Voice critic Robert Christgau said "Robert Fripp's austere production of this witty, pretty music not only abjures alien instrumentation but also plays up the quirks of the Roches' less-than-commanding voices and acoustic guitars. Thus it underscores their vulnerability and occasional desperation and counteracts their flirtations with the coy and the fey. The result is not a perfect record, but rather one whose imperfections are lovingly mitigated." It was voted #11 for the year in The Village Voices Pazz & Jop Critics Poll.

It has continued to be highly rated. AllMusic characterized it as a "mischievous and highly original folk blend". Rating the album 10/10 in the Spin Alternative Record Guide, Ann Powers praised Fripp's guitar accompaniment and spare "audio vérité" production but noted his efforts "would be merely a gorgeous surface if not for the songs themselves. Suzzy and Terre each contribute winners, but it's Maggie whose genius dominates." The Rolling Stone Album Guide gave it five stars and called it an "unprecedented thrill" that was "spare, loose, pointed" and equating it to the Greenwich Village version of the New York punk explosion.

Cover versions and samples
"The Married Men" was covered by Phoebe Snow on her 1979 album Against the Grain.

"Hammond Song" was covered by The Colourfield on their 1985 debut album Virgins and Philistines and by Whitney on their 2020 album Candid. It was also covered by salyu x salyu on the 2012 album s(o)un(d)beams+.

In 2020, The Avalanches sampled "Hammond Song" on "We Will Always Love You" (feat. Blood Orange), the first single from their album We Will Always Love You. The sampled line, "We'll always love you but that's not the point," forms the refrain of the song.

Track listing
 "We"  (Suzzy Roche, Terre Roche, Margaret Roche) – 2:35
 "Hammond Song" (Margaret Roche) – 5:46
 "Mr. Sellack" (Terre Roche) – 4:03
 "Damned Old Dog" (Margaret Roche) – 4:07
 "The Troubles" (Suzzy Roche, Terre Roche, Margaret Roche) – 3:27
 "The Train" (Suzzy Roche) – 3:30
 "The Married Men" (Margaret Roche) – 4:32
 "Runs in the Family" (Terre Roche) – 3:29
 "Quitting Time" (Margaret Roche) – 4:19
 "Pretty and High" (Margaret Roche) – 4:05

Personnel

Musicians
Suzzy Roche – vocals, guitar
Maggie Roche – vocals, guitar, synthesizer (on "Quitting Time")
Terre Roche – vocals, guitar
Robert Fripp – electric guitar, Fripperies (on "Hammond Song")
Tony Levin – bass guitar
Jim Maelen – triangle, shaker
Larry Fast – synthesizer programmer

Production
"Produced in Audio Verite by Robert Fripp"
Engineer: Ed Sprigg
Assistant Engineer: Jon Smith
Recorded at The Hit Factory in New York City during September, October and November 1978

Other credits
Art direction: Peter Whorf
Design: Brad Kanawyer
Photography: Gary Heery

References

Further reading

External links 

1979 debut albums
Warner Records albums
The Roches albums
Albums produced by Robert Fripp